Transversotrema lacerta is a species of trematodes found in haemulids on Heron Island and Lizard Island. It is characterised by its number of vitelline follicles enclosed by its cyclocoel and by the size of its testicle.

References

Further reading
Miller, T. L., R. A. Bray, and T. H. Cribb. "Taxonomic approaches to and interpretation of host specificity of trematodes of fishes: lessons from the Great Barrier Reef." Parasitology 138.13 (2011): 1710–1722.

External links

Plagiorchiida
Trematodes parasiting fish
Animals described in 2010